Éire Óg Derriaghy GAC is a Gaelic Athletic Association club from the outskirts of Dunmurry, County Antrim, Northern Ireland. Founded in 1932, and playing out of Woodlands Playing Fields, Éire Óg Doire Achaidh is the local club for the parishes of St Anne's and Our Lady Queen of Peace, providing Gaelic football and Hurling teams for the children of Derriaghy, Finaghy, Dunmurry, Black's Road, Glengoland and Cloona. The club has teams from Primary 1 level all the way through to senior level.

History
In 1948 Éire Óg won their only Senior Football Championship title to date. After beating Ardoyne and Dunloy GAC, Éire Óg knocked out the holders, O’Connell’s, in the semi-final winning 1-7 to 1-3, despite a late comeback by O’Connell’s. The winning Ógs team was a very young team - only five of them being over 21 years of age.

Éire Óg has contributed many county footballers and hurlers. 1951 was the last year that Antrim won the Ulster Senior Football Championship. Éire Óg had five representatives in the team - Jimmy Roe, Brian O'Kane, Peter O'Hara and Donagh Forde all started, while David O'Kane was one of the substitutes. Jimmy Roe, Brian O’Kane and Peter O’Hara would go on to start against Meath in the All Ireland semi-final at Croke Park , but Antrim unfortunately lost 2-06 to 1-07.

Brian O’Kane’s brother, Hugh, also played senior county football and was the captain of the first ever Queen's University Belfast team to lift the Sigerson Cup. The Ógs also had an international soccer player in their team. Tommy Forde played for the Northern Ireland national football team throughout the 1950s as well as playing football for Éire Óg.

Honours
Antrim Senior Football Championship 
1948
Antrim Intermediate Football Championship
1985
Antrim Junior Football Championship
1938
1979
2001
Antrim Intermediate Hurling Championship
1937
1952
Antrim Junior Hurling Championship
1932
1951
1967
1974

Notable players
Tommy Rice - Antrim Hurling Player in 1939.
Peter McGarvey - Antrim Hurling Player in 1939.
Jimmy Roe - Antrim Football Player who won the 1951 Ulster Senior Football Championship.
Brian O’Kane - Antrim Football Player who won the 1951 Ulster Senior Football Championship.
Peter O'Hara - Antrim Football Player who won the 1951 Ulster Senior Football Championship.
Donagh Forde - Antrim Football Player who won the 1951 Ulster Senior Football Championship.
David O'Kane - Antrim Football Player who won the 1951 Ulster Senior Football Championship.
Hugh O'Kane - Captain of the first ever Queen's University team to lift the Sigerson Cup.
Tommy Forde - Northern Ireland International Soccer Player.

References

External links
 Éire Óg Doire Achaidh
 Antrim at ClubGAA
 Antrim Senior Football Championship

Gaelic games clubs in County Antrim